Euro College (Kumanovo) is an accredited private college in North Macedonia. Degree programs take 2/3 years and the graduates are awarded with a Bachelor or master's degree in Business Administration after completing 180 ECTS/120 ECTS.

The college is also an official partner of American Heritage University of Southern California

References

External links

Universities in North Macedonia
Buildings and structures in Kumanovo